This is a list of films which placed number one at the weekend box office in Mexico for the year 2022.

Highest-grossing films

See also
 List of Mexican films — Mexican films by year

References

2022
Box office
Mexico